Co-Bo or Co′Bo′ is a wheel arrangement in the UIC classification system for railway locomotives. It features two uncoupled bogies. The "Co" bogie has three driven axles and the "Bo" bogie has two. 

The arrangement has been used to even out axle loading. The weight distribution of the locomotive depends on the power unit, the engine and generator. If these are not placed symmetrically, the weight distribution is also biased to one end. Placing three axles beneath the engine end and just two beneath the other, with the lighter ancillaries, gives more even loading per-axle.

Examples

Diesel

The British Railways Class 28 is the first (and only) UK locomotive with a Co-Bo wheel arrangement.

C-B 

A similar wheel arrangement, with five axles across two bogies, is also used in Japan for the Class DE10, DE11, and DE15 locomotives. As these are diesel-hydraulic locomotives, they are of C-B arrangement, not Co-Bo. A hydrodynamic transmission on the locomotive frame is driven by the prime mover, then drive to each bogie is taken by cardan shafts. The axles of each bogie are all driven, and all geared together, rather than having separate traction motors.

Steam
Some Engerth steam locomotives were built to the Fink system, with the four trailing wheels driven by a crankshaft and connecting rods, thus making them 0-6-4-0Ts instead of 0-6-4Ts.

In fiction
BoCo is a fictional Co-Bo locomotive, a British Rail Class 28. The locomotive appeared in the Railway Series book Main Line Engines and the following television series.

See also
 Co-Co, has two six-wheeled bogies with all axles powered

References

CB,0C00B0,Co-Bo